"You and I" is a song recorded by Canadian singer Celine Dion, released as the lead single from her 2004 album, A New Day... Live in Las Vegas. It was released as a promotional single on 24 May 2004.

Background and release
The music video was filmed by an award-winning director Andrew MacNaughtan in July 2004 and was shot partly at the Toronto Pearson International Airport. It premiered two months later. The music video can be found on the Ultimate Box, which was released in Japan in 2008. The music video was nominated for the MuchMoreMusic Award at the 2005 MuchMusic Video Awards.

In October 2004, it was announced that "You and I" would be the theme of Air Canada's new advertising campaign. At the same time the airline unveiled new in-flight service products and new aircraft livery. Dion also recorded a one-minute-long French version of the song called "Mes ailes à moi." Both versions were used in Air Canada's commercials.

The single was a radio hit, topping the Canadian Adult Contemporary Chart for five non-consecutive weeks in July and August 2004, and spending 34 weeks on the chart in total.

On 19 June 2007, US Senator Hillary Clinton announced that "You and I" would be her campaign song in her 2008 bid for the Democratic Party nomination for US president. The song was selected as a result of a month-long web campaign to select a theme song.

In October 2008, "You and I" was included on the European version of My Love: Ultimate Essential Collection greatest hits.

Critical reception
Chuck Taylor of Billboard magazine wrote about the song: "The plucky "You and I" is an ideal vehicle to launch a full-scale seasonal assault on the airwaves, with its love-my-man thematics and kinetic, summer-breeze tempo, akin to her signature "That's the Way It Is." Dion dispenses a joyful romp from the mic, sounding fresh and fully at ease, and she riffs just enough to stamp the song with a telltale trademark or two."

Charts

Weekly charts

Year-end charts

References

External links

2004 singles
Celine Dion songs
Live singles
Songs written by Aldo Nova
Music videos directed by Andrew MacNaughtan
2004 songs
Air Canada